Aspects of Scientific Explanation and other Essays in the Philosophy of Science is a 1965 book by the philosopher Carl Gustav Hempel. It is regarded as one of the most important works in the philosophy of science written after World War II.

Reception
The historian Peter Gay wrote that Aspects of Scientific Explanation was "seminal" and "indispensable", writing that Hempel persuasively argued that "the logic of history and that of the natural sciences are the same." Gay observed that Hempel's essay "The Function of General Laws in History" is a "much debated classic". The philosopher Michael Friedman described the book as one of the most important works in philosophy of science written after World War II.

See also
 Models of scientific inquiry

References

Bibliography
Books

 
 
 

1965 non-fiction books
American non-fiction books
Books by Carl Gustav Hempel
English-language books
Essay collections
Philosophy of science literature